Bill Hopkins (5 June 1943 – 10 March 1981) was a British composer. He also published music criticism, mostly under the name G. W. Hopkins.

Biography
Hopkins was born in Prestbury, Cheshire, and educated at Hillcrest Grammar School and Rossall School, Lancashire; his mother's disability meant she was unable to look after him, and he was raised by aunts. Studies with Luigi Nono at Dartington Summer School consolidated his interest in serialism; subsequently he studied at Oxford University with Edmund Rubbra and Egon Wellesz.

In 1964 he went to Paris, ostensibly to study with Olivier Messiaen but with the prime objective of meeting and studying with Jean Barraqué. Returning to England, he supported himself as a music critic in London and then, after moving first to Tintagel, Cornwall and subsequently to Peel, Isle of Man, by translation and writing music criticism. He married Clare Gilbert in 1972. Subsequently, he taught at Birmingham University and University of Newcastle upon Tyne before succumbing to a heart attack, in Chopwell, near Newcastle, at the age of 37. His few pupils included the British composers Paul Keenan and Patrick Ozzard-Low.

He was upset at an under-rehearsed first performance of En attendant in 1977 and this possibly discouraged him from composition in his later years. He was working on an opera project, tentatively called Nes and later Play on Music, when he died in 1981 at the age of 37, but little if any of this was completed.

Career
Hopkins' music is published by Universal Edition, Schott, and Ricordi. It has been performed by Irvine Arditti, David Atherton, Alexander Balanescu, Richard Bernas, Nicolas Hodges, Geoffrey Douglas Madge, Jane Manning, Holly Mathieson, Donatienne Michel-Dansac, Christopher Rowland, Sarah Maria Sun, Ilan Volkov and Alison Wells, as well as Ensemble Recherche, London Sinfonietta, BBC Symphony Orchestra, Music Projects/London, Christchurch Symphony Orchestra and the WDR Symphony Orchestra.

Works
This listing is of Hopkins' completed and acknowledged works. For further information about other works, see Paul Griffiths' provisional catalogue.

 Sous-structures. Solo piano. 1964, first performed 1965 (publ. Universal Edition, UE17700)
 Two Pomes (James Joyce). Soprano, bass clarinet, trumpet, harp, viola. 1964, first performed 1968 (publ. Universal Edition, UE14204)
 Musique de l'indifférence, Ballet after Samuel Beckett. Orchestra, 1964–65, first performed 2019 (publ. Ricordi) Nkoda
 Sensation (Rimbaud, Beckett). Soprano, tenor sax, trumpet, harp, viola. 1965, first performed 1965. (publ. Schott)
Etudes en série. Solo piano. 1965–72, first complete performance 1997. (publ. Schott)
Pendant. Solo violin. 1969, rev 1973, first performed 1975. (publ. Universal Edition, UE17943)
Nouvelle etude hors série. Solo organ. 1974, first performed 1993. (publ. Universal Edition, UE17303)
Lindaraja by Claude Debussy, orchestrated by Hopkins. Orchestra. 1975, first performed 2019. (publ. Universal Edition, UE18459)
En attendant. Flute, oboe, cello, harpsichord. 1976–77, first performed 1977. (publ. Schott)

The Bill Hopkins Collection at the Paul Sacher Foundation, Basel, holds Hopkins' manuscripts.

Recordings
His complete piano works have been recorded by Nicolas Hodges, (col legno, 2000). En Attendant, Two Pomes, Pendant and Sensation have been recorded by Music Projects/London and Richard Bernas, (NMC, 1992).

A new complete recording of his acknowledged works is in preparation.

Writings

Bibliography
Anon, "Musique Contemporaine à l'American Center", Le Monde, 4 December 1965. [Review of premiere of Sensation]
Boivin, Jean, La Classe de Messiaen, (Paris, Christian Bourgois, 1995), pp. 424–5
Gilbert, Anthony, Programme note for New mcnaghten Concerts (Sensation/Two Pomes/Pendant) (1985)
Gilbert, Anthony, ‘Bill Hopkins’, sleeve note for NMC D014 (1993)
Griffiths, Paul, "Bill Hopkins: A Provisional Catalogue of Compositions and Writings", Musical Times cxxii (1981), 600
Griffiths, Paul, Letter to the Editor, Tempo no.187 (1993)
Griffiths, Paul, Modern Music and After (Oxford: Oxford University Press, 1995), 233-5
Griffiths, Paul, "Hopkins, Bill", in Sadie, Stanley (ed.) The New Grove Dictionary of Music & Musicians, Second Edition (2001), Vol. 11, pp. 698–9
Hodges, Nicolas, "The Music of Bill Hopkins: A Preliminary Approach", Tempo No. 186, September 1993
Hodges, Nicolas, ‘Bill Hopkins’s Orchestration of Debussy’s “Lindaraja”’, Tempo No. 201 (1997), pp.28-31
Metzger, Heinz-Klaus, ‘Unvollendete Komponisten’, 18. Musik-Biennale Berlin [programme book], pp. 10–14 (esp. p. 14) 
Nyffeler, Max, ‘Zu spät gekommen, zu früh gegangen: Bill Hopkins – eine entdeckung’, Neue Zeitschrift für Musik, Heft 1/2001 (January/February)
Schiffer, Brigitte, 'London - Der Nachwuchs beschreitet traditionelle Wege', Melos 1975/III, pp. 214–216 (Hopkins' Pendant reviewed on p. 214)

References

External links
 Composer's website
 Hopkins page at Universal Edition
 Bill Hopkins Collection at the Paul Sacher Foundation
 

1943 births
1981 deaths
20th-century classical composers
Twelve-tone and serial composers
British classical composers
British male classical composers
Alumni of the University of Oxford
Academics of Newcastle University
People educated at Hillcrest Grammar School
People educated at Rossall School
People from Prestbury, Cheshire
Academics of the University of Birmingham
20th-century British composers
20th-century British male musicians